The Obinitsa (also known as the Tuhkvitsa) is a stream in Meremäe rural municipality that flows into the Piusa river.

Geography
The source of the Tuhkvitsa is the Ojaotsa springs. The stream flows entirely through Meremäe and passes Obinitsa Reservoir. Tepia, Serga, Tobrova, Lepä and Obinitsa villages are situated on the stream. Tepia sacrificial spring is located near Tepia village, by the stream that is believed to be a holy spring and to have healing properties.

Watermills
There were 8 watermills on the Tuhkvitsa: Serga, Tepia, Lepa, Tobrova, Porga, Kruuse, Sonne and Ala-Tsumba. Only Serga mill had an undershot water-wheel as a power source, all the other watermills had overshot wheels. Today, all the watermills have disappeared. The banks of the upper reaches of the stream are shallow and fringed by farmlands and meadows, but from Kruuse mill onwards, a deep natural valley is formed and the banks are mostly covered by alder. The banks used to be bordered by hayfields and pastures and there was no natural vegetation.

References

Rivers of Estonia
Landforms of Võru County